The torrent flyrobin (Monachella muelleriana) is a species of passerine bird in the Australasian robin family Petroicidae. It is also known as the torrent robin.

It is placed in the monotypic genus Monachella. The species occurs in New Guinea and on the island of New Britain in the Bismarck Archipelago. There are two subspecies: the nominate subspecies occurs in New Guinea and M. m. coultasi in New Britain.

As suggested by its name, the torrent flyrobin's preferred habitat is fast moving streams and rivers with protruding boulders.

References

 Del Hoyo, J.; Elliot, A. & Christie D. (editors). (2007). Handbook of the Birds of the World. Volume 12: Picathartes to Tits and Chickadees. Lynx Edicions. 

Birds of New Guinea
Birds of New Britain
torrent flyrobin
Taxonomy articles created by Polbot